WRAP (833 AM) was the first radio station in the Central Florida area. It was licensed from March 10, 1923, through September 7, 1923.

References

RAP
Defunct radio stations in the United States
Radio stations established in 1923
1923 establishments in Florida
1923 disestablishments in Florida
Radio stations disestablished in 1923
RAP